The 1929 All-Big Ten Conference football team consists of American football players selected to the All-Big Ten Conference teams chosen by various selectors for the 1929 Big Ten Conference football season.

All Big-Ten selections

Ends
 Wes Fesler, Ohio State (AP-1; NEA-1; UP-1; WE-1)
 Robert E. Tanner, Minnesota (AP-1; NEA-1; UP-1; WE-1)
 Frank L. Baker, Northwestern (NEA-2; UP-3; WE-2)
 Milt Gantenbein, Wisconsin (NEA-2; UP-3)
 Joe Truskowski, Michigan (UP-2)
 Wilbert O. Catterton, Indiana (UP-2)
 Arnold E. Wolgast, Illinois (WE-2)

Tackles
 Bronko Nagurski, Minnesota (AP-1; NEA-1; UP-1; WE-1)
 Elmer Sleight, Purdue (AP-1; NEA-2; UP-1; WE-1)
 Lou Gordon, Illinois (NEA-1; UP-2)
 Unger, Indiana (UP-2)
 John H. Riley, Northwestern (WE-2)
 Peter Westra, Iowa (NEA-1; WE-2)
 Milo Lubratovich, Wisconsin (UP-3)
 George Van Bibber, Purdue (NEA-2; UP-3)

Guards
 Fred Roberts, Iowa (AP-1; UP-1; WE-2)
 Henry J. Anderson, Northwestern (AP-1; NEA-1 [tackle]; UP-2; WE-1)
 John Parks, Wisconsin (UP-1)
 Russell J. Crane, Illinois (UP-2; WE-1)
 Howard W. Poe, Michigan (NEA-2)
 Sam T. Selby, Ohio State (NEA-2)
 George Stears, Purdue (WE-2)
 Denny Myers, Iowa (UP-3)
 Alfred E. Steinke, Michigan (UP-3)

Centers
 Mickey Erickson, Northwestern (AP-1; UP-1; WE-2)
 Alan Bovard, Michigan (NEA-1; WE-1)
 Ed Kawal, Illinois (NEA-2; UP-2)
 Weaver, Chicago, (UP-3)

Quarterbacks
 Glen Harmeson, Purdue (AP-1; NEA-1 [hb]; UP-1; WE-1)
 Forrest Peters, Illinois (NEA-1)
 Alan M. Holman, Ohio State (UP-2; WE-2)
 Win Brockmeyer, Minnesota (UP-3)

Halfbacks
 Willis Glassgow, Iowa (AP-1; NEA-1; UP-1; WE-1)
 Ralph Welch, Purdue (AP-1; NEA-1 [fb]; UP-1; WE-1)
 Oran Pape, Iowa (NEA-2; UP-2)
 Art Pharmer, Minnesota (NEA-2 [hb]; UP-2)
 Frank H. Walker, Illinois (WE-2)
 Van Nice, Chicago (NEA-2)
 Jud Timm, Illinois (UP-3)
 George O. Ross, Indiana (UP-3)

Fullbacks
 Russell Bergherm, Northwestern (AP-1; NEA-2; UP-1; WE-1)
 Joe Gembis, Michigan (UP-2; WE-2 [hb])
 Alex Yunevich, Purdue (WE-2)
 Harold Rebholz, Wisconsin (UP-3)

Key

AP = Associated Press "selected with the aid of nine conference coaches"

NEA = Newspaper Enterprise Association selected by William Bracher, sports expert for NEA

UP = United Press, based on consultations with coaches and football experts and "the consensus of its own men who have been covering games all season"

WE = Walter Eckersall of the Chicago Tribune; his 1929 selections were his last, as he died of a heart attack in March 1930 at age 43

Bold = Consensus first-team selection of at least two of the listed selectors (AP, NEA, UP and Eckersall)

See also
1929 College Football All-America Team

References

1929 Big Ten Conference football season
All-Big Ten Conference football teams